Vlastimil Babula (born 2 October 1973 in Uherský Brod) is a chess grandmaster from the Czech Republic who was Czech Champion in 1993 and second at the World Junior Championship of 1993.

Chess career
In 1998 Babula tied for 1st–4th with Liviu-Dieter Nisipeanu, Bartłomiej Macieja and Zoltán Almási in the Zone 1.4 zonal tournament in Krynica and qualified to the FIDE World Chess Championship 1999 where he was knocked out in the first round by Tal Shaked. In 2007, he was joint winner of the Czech Open (with Viktor Láznička). He took part in the Chess World Cup 2011, but was eliminated in the first round by Zahar Efimenko.

Babula played for the Czech Republic in the Chess Olympiads of 1994, 1996, 1998, 2000, 2002, 2004, 2006, 2008, 2010 and 2012.

References

External links 

1973 births
Living people
People from Uherský Brod
Chess grandmasters
Czech chess players
Chess Olympiad competitors